Hongzhou is a township in Huixian, Henan, China. 

Township-level divisions of Henan
Huixian